Cyrtodactylus fumosus  is a species of gecko that is endemic to Sulawesi in Indonesia.

References 

Cyrtodactylus
Reptiles described in 1895
Reptiles of Sulawesi